A finish line may refer to:

Sports
 The line denoting the physical ending point for a sport, as in racing

Art, entertainment, and media

Films
 Finish Line (1989 film), a television film starring Josh Brolin
 Finish Line (2008 film), a television film starring Scott Baio and Taylor Cole

Music
 "Finish Line" (Lou Reed song), a song from Set the Twilight Reeling
 "Finish Line" (Yasmin song), a song from Yasmin
 "The Finish Line" (Axium song), a song by Axium from The Story Thus Far
 "The Finish Line" (Train song), a song by Train from Save Me, San Francisco
 "Finish Line", a song by Lou Reed from Set the Twilight Reeling
 "Finish Line/Drown", a song by Chance the Rapper from Coloring Book
 "Finish Line", a song by Elton John and Stevie Wonder from The Lockdown Sessions
 "The Finish Line", a song by Snow Patrol on their 2006 album Eyes Open
 "The Finish Line", a song by Michael Angelo Batio from No Boundaries
"The Finish Line", a song by Michael Angelo Batio from Tradition; a remake of the above

Television
 "Finish Line" (The Price Is Right), a segment game from The Price Is Right
 "Finish Line" (The Flash), an episode of The Flash

Business
 Finish Line, Inc., an athletic retailer based in the United States

See also
 End of the Line (disambiguation)
 "Finish Last", a song from All Gas. No Brake. by Stellar Kart
 Finishing Line, a Singaporean Chinese television series
 The Finishing Line (1977), a short film produced by British Transport Films, warning about the dangers children face on railway lines